Tomb KV29 is an ancient Egyptian tomb in the Valley of the Kings, located in the Theban Necropolis in Egypt. It is located near the mid-Eighteenth Dynasty tombs of Tiaa (KV32), Thutmose II or Merytre-Hatshepsut (KV42), and Thutmose III (KV34). The tomb was given the number KV29 in 1899 but no records of an earlier excavation exist. The entrance shaft was previously planned by the Theban Mapping Project prior to 1994. The tomb was first excavated by the University of Basel King's Valley Project in 2011.

Excavation
Excavation of the shaft began in January of 2011; half the depth proved to be flood debris from the 1994 flood and modern debris from the 1960s onwards. The rest of the shaft contained clean fill washed in during earlier floods. The shaft was capped with an iron door at the conclusion of the 2011 season.

Excavation resumed in 2016. The shaft  was found to open to the west onto a room, also filled with debris. The extent of the room was investigated for Swiss Television using a telescoping camera and flashlights. The architectural layout of the room is unknown, as it is so full of debris any possible side chamber doorways are obscured.

References

External links
Theban Mapping Project: KV29 - Includes detailed maps of most of the tombs.

Valley of the Kings

it:KV24-KV33